Lauri Clapp is a former state legislator in Colorado. The Colorado Independent described her as a conservative firebrand. She served in the Colorado House of Representatives from 1999 to 2006. A Republican, she represented Arapahoe County.

She was one of several conservative Republicans in the House along with Vickie Agler, Nancy Spence, Lynn Hefley, Lola Spradley, and Debbie Allen (politician).

References

Year of birth missing (living people)
Living people
Republican Party Colorado state senators
Republican Party members of the Colorado House of Representatives
20th-century American politicians
21st-century American politicians
People from Arapahoe County, Colorado
Women state legislators in Colorado
21st-century American women politicians
20th-century American women politicians